The New Look is an upcoming biographical drama television series created by Todd A. Kessler.

Premise
The series depicts Christian Dior in Paris after World War II when he created his fashion line that  unofficially got named New Look.

Cast
 Ben Mendelsohn as Christian Dior
 Juliette Binoche as Coco Chanel
 Maisie Williams as Catherine Dior
 John Malkovich as Lucien Lelong
 Emily Mortimer as Eva Colozzi
 Claes Bang as Hans Von Dincklage
 Hugo Becker as Hervé
 Alexis Loizon as Jean Marais
 Thomas Poitevin as Pierre Balmain
 Zabou Breitman as Madame Zehnacker
 Jodie Ruth-Forest as seamstress Jodie

Production
It was announced in February 2022 that Apple TV+ had greenlit the project, which has the potential to become an anthology series. Todd A. Kessler was set to write, direct and executive producer, with Ben Mendelsohn and Juliette Binoche cast to star. In May, Maisie Williams would join the cast, with John Malkovich, Emily Mortimer and Claes Bang added in June.

Two episodes of the series were directed by Julia Ducournau.

Filming began by May 2022 in Paris.

References

External links

Apple TV+ original programming
Upcoming drama television series
Television shows set in Paris
Television shows filmed in Paris